Rhoon is an above-ground subway station of Rotterdam Metro line D. The station is located just north of the centre of Rhoon, a village in the municipality Albrandswaard to the southwest of Rotterdam.

The station was opened on 25 October 1974. On that date, the North-South Line was extended from its former terminus, Slinge, towards Zalmplaat station. As a less busy station it is only equipped with one escalator located at the platform with the most upward motions, which as this is a station which is accessed via overpass, is the platform towards De Akkers on the North side. This side also has a secondary exit roughly at ground level.

Right outside the station, passengers can get on RET-operated bus line 62.

Rotterdam Metro stations
Albrandswaard
Railway stations opened in 1974
1974 establishments in the Netherlands
Railway stations in the Netherlands opened in the 20th century